Jorim is a type of Korean dish, made by simmering vegetables, meat, fish, seafood, or tofu in seasoned broth until the liquid is absorbed into the ingredients and reduced down. Jorim dishes are usually soy sauce-based, but gochujang (고추장) or gochugaru (고춧가루) can also be added, especially when fishier, red-fleshed fish such as mackerel, saury, or hairtail are used. In Korean royal court cuisine, jorim is called jorini.

Etymology 
Jorim is a verbal noun derived from the Korean verb jorida ("to boil down"). Although it was a commonly used culinary technique, the term did not appear until the 18th century, due to the slow development of culinary terminology. Instead, jorim dishes were classified as jochi, a category that encompasses jjim and jjigae as well as jorim. The first mention of the verbal noun jorim as a food category appeared in Siuijeonseo, a 19th-century cookbook, in describing jang-jorim (soy sauce simmered beef) methods.

Varieties 
 dubu-jorim – simmered tofu
 galchi-jorim – simmered largehead hairtail
 gamja-jorim – simmered potatoes
 godeungeo-jorim – simmered chub mackerel and radish
 Jang-jorim – simmered soy sauce simmered beef
 kkaennip-jorim – simmered perilla leaves
 kkongchi-jorim – simmered saury
 ueong-jorim – simmered burdock roots
 yeongeun-jorim – simmered lotus roots

Gallery

See also 

 Braising
 Jjim
 Kho

References 

Korean cuisine